USS Edward H. Allen (DE-531) was a John C. Butler-class destroyer escort in service with the United States Navy from 1943 to 1946 and from 1951 to 1958. She was sold for scrapping in 1974.

History
Edward H. Allen (DE-531) was named in honor of Lieutenant Edward Henry Allen who was awarded a Navy Cross for his brave actions during the Battle of the Coral Sea. She was launched 7 October 1943 by Boston Navy Yard; sponsored by Mrs. David H. Clark; and commissioned 16 December 1943.

1943-1946 
 
Edward H. Allen sailed from Boston, Massachusetts, 6 March 1944 for Miami, Florida, to serve as schoolship for pre-commissioning crews of escort vessels. She had similar duty at Norfolk, Virginia, from June to November 1944, then returned to Miami until 10 June 1945. She was at Casco Bay preparing for service in the Pacific Ocean when the war ended, and remained there for experimental operations. After spending Navy Day at Boston, Edward H. Allen sailed to Green Cove Springs, Florida, where she was placed out of commission in reserve 10 May 1946.

1951-1958 
 
Recommissioned 26 February 1951 Edward H. Allen was assigned to the 3rd Naval District and cruised from New York to Florida, Bermuda, and the Caribbean in connection with the Naval Reserve training program. From 13 June to 10 July 1953 and again from 17 June to 15 July 1955 she made extended cruises, visiting ports in France, Portugal, England, Spain, and the Azores.

Rescuing Andrea Doria survivors 
While at sea in July 1956 she was ordered to the scene of the tragic collision of the liners  and the SS Stockholm (later renamed ) and rescued the captain and 76 of the Doria crew before that vessel sank. Edward H. Allen continued her training duty until again placed out of commission in reserve 9 January 1958. On 1 July 1972 she was struck from the Navy list and, on 5 February 1974, she was sold for scrapping.

Military awards and honors 

For her assistance in the rescue of Andrea Doria survivors, the destroyer was thanked by the Italian Government and her commanding officer awarded the Italian Legion of Merit.

References

External links 
 NavSource Online: Destroyer Escort Photo Archive - USS Edward H. Allen (DE 531)

John C. Butler-class destroyer escorts
World War II frigates and destroyer escorts of the United States
Ships built in Boston
1943 ships